Baihata Chariali (Pron: baɪˈhɑ:tə ˈʧɑ:rɪˌɑ:lɪ) is an out growth urban centre of Guwahati City in Kamrup Rural district of Assam, India; situated at norther site of the river Brahmaputra. The place is called Chariali as it is a major road junction where National Highway 27 interconnect with National Highway 15.

Etymology
The 'Chariali' was suffixed to its name later due be a junction of four roads at its town square, including National highway 27 and National Highway 15.

Education
Delhi Public School, Kamrup is situated here. The 'Pub Kamrup college' is a well known college of entire district which is located here in Goreswar road. State government recently constructed a polytechnic college named Kamrup Polytechnic. There are a few private colleges for 10+2 studies. Some of them are Gateway Academy Junior College, Ramanujan Academy and Jenith Academy.

Place of interest

Madan Kamdev archeological site built by Pala dynasty of Kamrup Kingdom is located here.
The noteworthy Gopeshwar temple of village Deuduar situated near the town. Radha Kuchi is situated in the north of Baihata.

Transport
Baihata Chariali is situated at National Highway 27 and is well connected with nearby towns like Rangia, Nalbari and Guwahati with road and Railways. The National Highway 15 is connecting Baihata Chariali to the Eastern Assam via Tezpur. It is about half hour away from Guwahati. The Baihata Railway Station is at a distance of only 3 km from the town Center.

See also
 Kamalpur
 Bijoynagar

References

Cities and towns in Kamrup district